Yuliya Graudyn (born 13 November 1970) is a retired Russian hurdler. Her personal best for the 100 metres hurdles was 12.62 seconds, achieved in August 1994 in Berlin. She was a medalist in the event at the 1994 European Athletics Championships and 1995 World Championships in Athletics. Her husband Vladimir Graudyn was a world and European indoor medallist in the 800 m.

She was born Yuliya Filippova, the daughter of Igor Fillipov – a physical education teacher in Moscow.

International competitions

References

1970 births
Living people
Russian female hurdlers
Soviet female hurdlers
Olympic female hurdlers
Olympic athletes of Russia
Athletes (track and field) at the 1996 Summer Olympics
Athletes (track and field) at the 2000 Summer Olympics
World Athletics Championships athletes for Russia
World Athletics Championships medalists
European Athletics Championships medalists
Russian Athletics Championships winners